Spartan Health Sciences University is a private, for-profit medical school located in Vieux Fort, St. Lucia, in the Caribbean. Spartan confers upon its graduates the Doctor of Medicine (MD) degree. Spartan graduates can practice medicine in 46 US states.

History
Spartan was established in Saint Lucia on January 7, 1980, as St. Lucia Health Sciences University. The first campus was located in Castries, the capital city. In November 1983, the school was renamed Spartan Health Sciences University and relocated to Vieux Fort.

In 1989, Spartan University started to participate in the Federal Family Education Loan (FFEL) program under Title IV. They continued their participation until 1997. Almost two thirds of their student body received these loans. Due to a high default rate and inability to provide sufficient documentation during US Department of Education review of financial assistance at the school, the school was ordered to repay several hundred thousand dollars back to the program.

In 1997, it was temporarily delisted from the World Directory of Medical Schools after the St. Lucia government  awkwardly denied knowledge of the existence of the school. Relationships between the government and the school have since improved, and today some of their graduates intern in the St. Lucia Ministry of Health.

The school started a nursing program in 2012, which by 2017 had graduated two classes of St. Lucian nurses.

Curriculum
The MD program at Spartan is a ten-trimester course of study that consists of three trimester per calendar year. trimesters 1-5 are completed at the Saint Lucia campus; semesters 6-10 consist of 80 weeks of clinical study that are completed at teaching hospitals approved by the university.

Spartan also has a school of nursing. The nursing program was chartered by The Government of St Lucia and is licensed the University. It is also accredited by the Monitoring Committee appointed by the Government of St. Lucia to ensure that standards are comparable to those set by the Liaison Committee of Medical Education as required by the Department of Education in the United States. A school of veterinary medicine was opened on January 14, 2015, and was developed in collaboration with Techmedics Inc.

Accreditation
Spartan Health Sciences University is chartered and licensed in Saint Lucia. The university was listed in the FAIMER International Medical Education Directory (IMED) and in the Avicenna Directory for medicine (both now discontinued)  The school is listed in the World Directory of Medical Schools In 2013, Spartan was granted provisional accreditation by the Caribbean Accreditation Authority for Education in Medicine and other Health Professions (CAAMP-HP). The program was placed on probation from 2019-2022 by CAAMP-HP., as they were "unable to grant 
a further extension of provisional accreditation, having exhausted the maximum period allowed for this category of accreditation".

Licensure outside the United States
In the United Kingdom, the General Medical Council has listed Spartan as an institution whose graduates (who started their course of study on or before December 31, 2008) are ineligible for licensure.

See also
 Medical school
 International medical graduate
 List of medical schools in the Caribbean

References

External links
 

Universities and colleges in Saint Lucia
Medical schools in the Caribbean
Vieux Fort, Saint Lucia
Educational institutions established in 1980
1980 establishments in Saint Lucia